Alfonso Osvaldo Lara Madrid (27 April 1946 – 13 August 2013) was a Chilean football midfielder who played for Chile in the 1974 FIFA World Cup. He also played for Colo-Colo.

References

External links
 Alfonso Lara at playmakerstats.com (English version of ceroacero.es)
 
 

1946 births
2013 deaths
Chilean footballers
Chile international footballers
Association football midfielders
Everton de Viña del Mar footballers
Magallanes footballers
Colo-Colo footballers
Lota Schwager footballers
Chilean Primera División players
1974 FIFA World Cup players
1975 Copa América players
Magallanes managers